The  season was the Chicago Bears's 85th season in the National Football League. The team failed to improve on their 7–9 record as they fell to a 5–11 record, under first-year head coach Lovie Smith. The team was once again in a quarterbacking carousel after the injury of starter Rex Grossman early on in the season. This was the team's eighth losing season in the past nine seasons.

According to statistics site Football Outsiders, the 2004 Bears had the third-worst offense, play-for-play, in their ranking history. Chicago's 231 points and 3,816 offensive yards were dead-last in the league in 2004. Their team quarterback passer rating was 61.7 for the year, also last.

The Bears started four different quarterbacks in 2004 – Chad Hutchinson, Craig Krenzel, Jonathan Quinn, and Rex Grossman. Grossman (the only Bears quarterback who would average more than 200 yards passing per game in 2004) would eventually establish himself as the starter, and two seasons later, would lead the Bears to their second NFC Championship and an appearance in the Super Bowl.

Offseason

2004 Draft

Roster

Preseason

Schedule

Regular season

Schedule

Week 1: vs Detroit Lions

Scoring Summary

Q1 – CHI – 7:38 – Thomas Jones 2 yd TD run (Paul Edinger kick) (CHI 7–0)

Q2 – DET – 0:16 – Jason Hanson 27 yd FG (CHI 7–3)

Q3 – DET – 12:17 – Bracy Walker 92 yd blocked FG return TD (Hanson kick) (DET 10–7)

Q3 – DET – 7:37 – Jason Hanson 21 yd FG (DET 13–7)

Q4 – CHI – 12:40 – Thomas Jones 2 yd TD run (Edinger kick) (CHI 14–13)

Q4 – DET – 9:54 – 4 yd TD pass from Joey Harrington to Az-Zahir Hakim (Hanson kick) (DET 20–14)

Q4 – CHI – 1:53 – Safety, Nick Harris ran out of bounds in own end zone (DET 20–16)

Week 2 at Packers

Week 3: at Minnesota Vikings
at the Hubert H. Humphrey Metrodome in Minneapolis, Minnesota

Scoring summary

Q1 – CHI – 8:08 – Paul Edinger 34 yd FG (CHI 3–0)

Q2 – CHI – 13:41 – Paul Edinger 23 yd FG (CHI 6–0)

Q2 – MIN – 8:57 – 3 yd TD pass from Daunte Culpepper to Randy Moss (Morten Andersen kick) (MIN 7–6)

Q2 – MIN – 5:09 – Morten Andersen 42 yd FG (MIN 10–6)

Q3 – MIN – 10:58 – Daunte Culpepper 1 yd TD run (Andersen kick) (MIN 17–6)

Q4 – CHI – 14:46 – Paul Edinger 32 yd FG (MIN 17–9)

Q4 – MIN – 11:20 – Morten Andersen 24 yd FG (MIN 20–9)

Q4 – CHI – 6:20 – Thomas Jones 1 yd TD run (2 pt conversion failed) (MIN 20–15)

Q4 – MIN – 5:39 – 2 yd TD pass from Daunte Culpepper to Randy Moss (Andersen kick) (MIN 27–15)

Q4 – CHI – 2:00 – Rex Grossman 6 yd TD run (Edinger kick) (MIN 27–22)

Week 4: vs Philadelphia Eagles
at Soldier Field in Chicago

Scoring summary
Q1 – PHI – 5:00 – David Akers 51 yd FG (PHI 3–0)

Q2 – PHI – 10:59 – David Akers 42 yd FG (PHI 6–0)

Q2 – PHI – 6:03 – 11 yd TD pass from Donovan McNabb to Terrell Owens (Akers kick) (PHI 13–0)

Q2 – PHI – 1:57 – David Akers 42 yd FG (PHI 16–0)

Q2 – CHI – 0:06 – Paul Edinger 25 yd FG (PHI 16–3)

Q3 – PHI – 4:41 – David Akers 40 yd FG (PHI 19–3)

Q4 – CHI – 3:57 – 2 yd TD pass from Jonathan Quinn to Bryan Johnson (2 pt conversion failed) (PHI 19–9)

Week 5: Bye Week

Week 6: vs Washington Redskins
at Soldier Field in Chicago

Scoring summary

Q1 – WAS – 5:41 – Ola Kimrin 41 yd FG (WAS 3–0)

Q2 – WAS – 14:53 – 18 yd TD pass from Mark Brunell to Rod Gardner (Kimrin kick) (WAS 10–0)

Q2 – CHI – 5:36 – Jerry Azumah 70 yd interception return TD (Paul Edinger kick) (WAS 10–7)

Q4 – WAS – 11:13 – Ola Kimrin 26 yd FG (WAS 13–7)

Q4 – CHI – 5:10 – Paul Edinger 46 yd FG (WAS 13–10)

Week 7: at Tampa Bay Buccaneers
at Raymond James Stadium in Tampa, Florida

Scoring summary
Q2 – TB – 13:25 – Martín Gramática 22 yd FG (TB 3–0)

Q2 – TB – 0:48 – 6 yd TD pass from Brian Griese to Michael Clayton (Gramática kick) (TB 10–0)

Q3 – TB – 12:23 – Martín Gramática 22 yd FG (TB 13–0)

Q3 – CHI – 3:45 – Thomas Jones 1 yd TD run (Paul Edinger kick) (TB 13–7)

Q4 – TB – 8:52 – Michael Pittman 3 yd TD run (2 pt conversion failed) (TB 19–7)

Week 8: vs San Francisco 49ers
at Soldier Field in Chicago

Scoring summary

Q1 – CHI – 13:01 – 49 yd TD pass from Craig Krenzel to Bernard Berrian (Paul Edinger kick) (CHI 7–0)

Q1 – SF – 5:26 – Dwaine Carpenter 80 yd fumble return TD (Todd Peterson kick) (7–7)

Q1 – SF – 0:40 – Todd Peterson 48 yd FG (SF 10–7)

Q2 – CHI – 13:27 – Paul Edinger 52 yd FG (10–10)

Q2 – SF – 6:20 – Todd Peterson 51 yd FG (SF 13–10)

Q2 – CHI – 4:35 – Paul Edinger 45 yd FG (13–13)

Q4 – CHI – 13:59 – Paul Edinger 27 yd FG (CHI 16–13)

Q4 – CHI – 3:52 – Nathan Vasher 71 yd interception return TD (Edinger kick) (CHI 23–13)

Week 9: at New York Giants
at Giants Stadium in East Rutherford, New Jersey

Scoring summary

Q1 – NYG – 8:03 – Tiki Barber 3 yd TD run (Steve Christie kick) (NYG 7–0)

Q1 – NYG – 3:54 – Tiki Barber 1 yd TD run (Christie kick) (NYG 14–0)

Q2 – CHI – 5:13 – 35 yd TD pass from Craig Krenzel to Bernard Berrian (Paul Edinger kick) (NYG 14–7)

Q2 – CHI – 2:35 – Anthony Thomas 4 yd TD run (Edinger kick) (14–14)

Q2 – CHI – 1:09 – Paul Edinger 22 yd FG (CHI 17–14)

Q2 – CHI – 0:00 – Paul Edinger 21 yd FG (CHI 20–14)

Q4 – CHI – 7:44 – Anthony Thomas 41 yd TD run (Craig Krenzel run for 2 pt conversion) (CHI 28–14)

Q4 – NYG – 1:56 – 1 yd TD pass from Kurt Warner to Jeremy Shockey (Christie kick) (CHI 28–21)

Week 10: at Tennessee Titans
at The Coliseum in Nashville, Tennessee

Scoring summary

Q1 – TEN – 2:17 – 29 yd TD pass from Billy Volek to Derrick Mason (Gary Anderson kick) (TEN 7–0)

Q2 – CHI – 0:18 – Michael Haynes 45 yd interception return TD (Paul Edinger kick) (7–7)

Q3 – CHI – 11:04 – R. W. McQuarters 75 yd punt return TD (Edinger kick) (CHI 14–7)

Q4 – TEN – 12:55 – Gary Anderson 33 yd FG (CHI 14–10)

Q4 – TEN – 6:00 – 47 yd TD pass from Billy Volek to Drew Bennett (Anderson kick) (TEN 17–14)

Q4 – CHI – 0:52 – Paul Edinger 29 yd FG (17–17)

OT – CHI – 11:43 – Safety, Fred Miller tackled in own end zone by Adewale Ogunleye (CHI 19–17)

Week 11: vs Indianapolis Colts
at Soldier Field in Chicago

Scoring summary

Q1 – IND – 9:05 – 14 yd TD pass from Peyton Manning to Marcus Pollard (Mike Vanderjagt kick) (IND 7–0)

Q1 – CHI – 2:12 – Paul Edinger 51 yd FG (IND 7–3)

Q2 – IND – 14:04 – 35 yd TD pass from Peyton Manning to Reggie Wayne (Vanderjagt kick) (IND 14–3)

Q2 – IND – 10:56 – Mike Vanderjagt 34 yd FG (IND 17–3)

Q2 – IND – 5:41 – 10 yd TD pass from Peyton Manning to Marvin Harrison (Vanderjagt kick) (IND 24–3)

Q2 – IND – 0:59 – Mike Vanderjagt 20 yd FG (IND 27–3)

Q3 – IND – 8:26 – 27 yd TD pass from Peyton Manning to Reggie Wayne (Vanderjagt kick) (IND 34–3)

Q3 – IND – 0:42 – Edgerrin James 11 yd TD run (Vanderjagt kick) (IND 41–3)

Q4 – CHI – 1:37 – 2 yd TD pass from Craig Krenzel to Dustin Lyman (Edinger kick) (IND 41–10)

Week 12: at Dallas Cowboys
at Texas Stadium in Irving, Texas

Scoring summary

Q1 – DAL – 10:43 – Julius Jones 33 yd TD run (Billy Cundiff kick) (DAL 7–0)

Q2 – CHI – 5:57 – R. W. McQuarters 45 yd interception return TD (Paul Edinger kick) (7–7)

Q4 – DAL – 11:07 – 5 yd TD pass from Vinny Testaverde to Darian Barnes (Cundiff kick) (DAL 14–7)

Q4 – DAL – 7:00 – Julius Jones 4 yd TD run (Cundiff kick) (DAL 21–7)

Week 13: vs Minnesota Vikings
at Soldier Field in Chicago

Scoring summary

Q1 – CHI – 4:47 – 6 yd TD pass from Chad Hutchinson to Desmond Clark (Paul Edinger kick) (CHI 7–0)

Q1 – MIN – 1:19 – 4 yd TD pass from Daunte Culpepper to Nate Burleson (Morten Andersen kick) (7–7)

Q2 – CHI – 11:22 – Paul Edinger 53 yd FG (CHI 10–7)

Q2 – MIN – 2:23 – 40 yd TD pass from Daunte Culpepper to Marcus Robinson (Andersen kick) (MIN 14–10)

Q2 – CHI – 0:22 – 15 yd TD pass from Chad Hutchinson to David Terrell (Edinger kick) (CHI 17–14)

Q4 – CHI – 10:23 – 5 yd TD pass from Chad Hutchinson to Jason McKie (Edinger kick) (CHI 24–14)

Week 14: at Jacksonville Jaguars
at Alltel Stadium in Jacksonville, Florida

Scoring summary

Q1 – JAX – 3:18 – 6 yd TD pass from Byron Leftwich to Reggie Williams (Josh Scobee kick) (JAX 7–0)

Q2 – CHI – 1:44 – Paul Edinger 42 yd FG (JAX 7–3)

Q2 – JAX – 0:31 – Josh Scobee 30 yd FG (JAX 10–3)

Q3 – JAX – 5:36 – Josh Scobee 25 yd FG (JAX 13–3)

Q4 – JAX – 13:48 – Safety, Chad Hutchinson sacked in own end zone by Daryl Smith (JAX 15–3)

Q4 – JAX – 9:26 – 31 yd TD pass from Byron Leftwich to Jimmy Smith (Scobee kick) (JAX 22–3)

Week 15: vs Houston Texans
at Soldier Field in Chicago

Scoring summary

Q2 – HOU – 0:27 – 37 yd TD pass from David Carr to Corey Bradford (Kris Brown kick) (HOU 7–0)

Q3 – CHI – 4:06 – Safety, intentional grounding by David Carr in own end zone (HOU 7–2)

Q4 – CHI – 14:09 – Paul Edinger 43 yd FG (HOU 7–5)

Q4 – HOU – 11:37 – Kris Brown 20 yd FG (HOU 10–5)

Q4 – HOU – 4:23 – Domanick Davis 11 yd TD run (Brown kick) (HOU 17–5)

Q4 – HOU – 2:37 – Charlie Anderson 60 yd fumble return TD (Brown kick) (HOU 24–5)

Week 16: at Detroit Lions
at Ford Field in Detroit, Michigan

Scoring summary

Q1 – DET – 3:06 – Jason Hanson 31 yd FG (DET 3–0)

Q2 – DET – 11:30 – Kevin Jones 1 yd TD run (Hanson kick) (DET 10–0)

Q2 – DET – 5:50 – Jason Hanson 39 yd FG (DET 13–0)

Q2 – DET – 0:00 – Jason Hanson 34 yd FG (DET 16–0)

Q3 – CHI – 3:40 – Lance Briggs 38 yd interception return TD (2 pt conversion failed) (DET 16–6)

Q4 – DET – 11:29 – Jason Hanson 40 yd FG (DET 19–6)

Q4 – CHI – 7:04 – 15 yd TD pass from Chad Hutchinson to Jason McKie (Paul Edinger kick) (DET 19–13)

Week 17: vs Green Bay Packers
at Soldier Field in Chicago

Scoring summary

Q1 – CHI – 12:54 – Thomas Jones 2 yd TD run (Paul Edinger kick) (CHI 7–0)

Q1 – GB – 3:22 – 17 yd TD pass from Brett Favre to Bubba Franks (Ryan Longwell kick) (7–7)

Q2 – GB – 13:16 – 38 yd TD pass from Brett Favre to William Henderson (Longwell kick) (GB 14–7)

Q2 – GB – 11:52 – Darren Sharper 43 yd interception return TD (Longwell kick) (GB 21–7)

Q2 – GB – 6:14 – 25 yd TD pass from Craig Nall to Javon Walker (Longwell kick) (GB 28–7)

Q3 – CHI – 5:48 – Thomas Jones 1 yd TD run (Edinger kick) (GB 28–14)

Q3 – GB – 0:41 – Ryan Longwell 20 yd FG (GB 31–14)

Standings

External links 

 2004 Chicago Bears Season at www.bearshistory.com

References

Chicago Bears
Chicago Bears seasons
Chicago Bears
2000s in Chicago
2004 in Illinois